Chan Yun Tung (born 7 July 2002) is a Hong Kong professional footballer who currently plays as a right back for Hong Kong Premier League club HK U23, on loan from Rangers.

Career statistics

Club

Notes

References

Living people
2002 births
Hong Kong footballers
Hong Kong youth international footballers
Association football defenders
Hong Kong Premier League players
Happy Valley AA players
Hong Kong Rangers FC players
HK U23 Football Team players